Salem Saad Mubarak Saad Al-Abadla (1 September 1978 – 18 November 2009) was an Emirati footballer who played as a striker.

Career
Saad played club football for Al-Shabab and Al-Nasr.

He also played at international level for United Arab Emirates national football team between 2004 and 2009, scoring 2 goals in 39 appearances.

Death
Saad died of a heart attack during a training session on 18 November 2009.

References

External links
 
 

1978 births
2009 deaths
Emirati footballers
United Arab Emirates international footballers
Al-Nasr SC (Dubai) players
Al Shabab Al Arabi Club Dubai players
2004 AFC Asian Cup players
UAE Pro League players
Footballers at the 2002 Asian Games
Association football forwards
Asian Games competitors for the United Arab Emirates
Association football players who died while playing
Sport deaths in the United Arab Emirates